The 2017 TT Pro League season is the nineteenth season of the TT Pro League, the Trinidad and Tobago professional league for association football clubs, since its establishment in 1999. A total of ten teams are contesting the league, with Central FC the defending champions from the 2016–17 season.
The league will start on 9 June and will end on 28 November with the crowning of the champion. North East Stars were crowned champions on the penultimate match day. It was their first league title since 2004.

Changes from the 2016–17 season
The following changes were made since the 2016–17 season:

 The Pro League returns to playing from June to December in 2017.
 The following club changes occurred following the 2016–17 season.
 North East Stars will return to the Pro League after being sponsored by the franchise Ma Pau to form Ma Pau Stars. They will still be sponsored by Ma Pau but would not include the franchise in their name.
 North East Stars will play at the Arima Velodrome.

Player transfers

Carlos Edwards moved from North East Stars to Central.
Marcus Joseph moved from Central to W Connection
September
Densill Theobald moved to North East Stars from Mumbai F.C. in India.
Kevon Goddard moved from W Connection to North East Stars.

Managerial changes

Preseason
 Reynold Carrington would come in as head coach for Point Fortin Civic.
 Jamaal Shabazz would replace Rajesh Latchoo at Morvant Caledonia United.
September
 Dale Saunders quits Central F.C. and is replaced by Stern John.
 Anthony Streete steps down to assistant coach as he is replaced by Adrian Romain at St. Ann's Rangers

Teams

Team summaries

Note: Flags indicate national team as has been defined under FIFA eligibility rules. Players may hold more than one non-FIFA nationality.

Stadiums Used

Since the teams do not play in their set home stadium, these are the stadiums that were used to host the matches throughout the season.

League table

Positions by round

Results

Matches 1–18

Season statistics

Top scorers

References

External links 
Official Website
Soca Warriors Online, TT Pro League

TT Pro League seasons
2017 in Caribbean sport